Codie Bascue (born July 13, 1994) is an American bobsledder.  He is originally from Whitehall, New York. He competed in the two-man event and the four-man event at the 2018 Winter Olympics as a pilot.

References

External links
 
 
 
 

1994 births
Living people
American male bobsledders
Olympic bobsledders of the United States
Bobsledders at the 2018 Winter Olympics
Bobsledders at the 2012 Winter Youth Olympics
People from Whitehall, New York